Bhawanipur भवानीपुर is a village in Sunsari, Nepal. It is in the west side from Tarahara. Many different groups of people with different caste, culture, religion, and race reside in Bhawanipur. Bhawani refers to Shiva.

Schools
Shahid smriti bawasiye bidyalaya
Fujisan sagarmatha Boarding school
Jabdi madhyamik bidyalaye

Populated places in Sunsari District